The following list contains all NFL Draft selections made by the National Football League's Houston Texans franchise since the team's inception into the league in 2002. Included in the list is the 2002 NFL Expansion Draft.

Drafts by year

* Asterisk indicates a player who was selected to the Pro Bowl only as a member of another team.

Expansion Draft

2002

2003

2004

2005

2006

2007

2008

2009

2010

2011

2012

2013

2014

2015

2016

2017

2018

2019

2020

2021

2022

Draft Pick Breakdowns

Draft Picks by Position
The following table is a breakdown of all of the draft picks made by the Houston Texans since the 2002 NFL Draft by position of the players selected. The number of first round selections for each position are also included.

Draft Picks by College
The following schools have had multiple players selected by the Houston Texans since 2002.

Draft Picks From Texas Colleges
The following list outlines all of the draft selections from Texas colleges made by the Houston Texans since 2002.

Major draft trades 
 The Texans traded their second and fourth-round picks (36th and 117th overall) to the New England Patriots for their second and third-round picks (41st and 75th overall), which were used to select tight end Bennie Joppru and offensive tackle Seth Wand respectively.
 The Texans traded their second, third and fourth-round picks (40th, 73rd and 103rd overall) in the 2004 NFL Draft to the Tennessee Titans for their 2004 first-round pick (27th overall), which was used to select defensive end Jason Babin.  The Texans also exchanged their fifth-round pick (138th overall) for Tennessee's fifth-rounder (159th overall) as part of the deal.
 The Texans forfeited their second-round pick in the 2004 NFL Draft by selecting running back Tony Hollings in the 2003 Supplemental Draft.
 The Texans swapped their first-round pick in the 2005 NFL Draft (13th overall) with the New Orleans Saints (16th overall), which was used to select defensive tackle Travis Johnson.  The Texans also received the Saints' third-round pick in the 2006 NFL Draft (66th overall), which was used to select offensive tackle Eric Winston.
 The Texans traded their second and third-round picks (47th and 78th overall) in the 2005 NFL Draft to the Oakland Raiders for cornerback Phillip Buchanon.
 The Texans traded quarterback Drew Henson to the Dallas Cowboys for their third-round pick in the 2005 NFL Draft (73rd overall), which was used to select running back Vernand Morency.
 The Texans traded their second-round picks in the 2007 (39th overall) and 2008 NFL Draft (48th overall) to the Atlanta Falcons for quarterback Matt Schaub. The Texans (8th overall) and Falcons (10th overall) also swapped first-round picks as part of the deal. The Falcons would go on to draft Jamaal Anderson with the 8th pick and Justin Blalock with the 39th pick, while the Texans would take Amobi Okoye with the 10th pick.
The Texans traded their No. 18 overall pick in the 2008 NFL Draft to the Baltimore Ravens in exchange for the No. 26 overall pick (Duane Brown) in the first round, as well as the Ravens' third-round pick (No. 89 overall, Steve Slaton) and the Ravens' sixth-round pick (No. 173 overall, Dominique Barber) in the 2008 draft.
The Texans traded quarterback Deshaun Watson and a sixth-round pick in 2024 to the Cleveland Browns for first-round picks in 2022, 2023 and 2024, a third-round pick in 2023, and a fourth-round pick in 2024.

Notes and references 

draft history
National Football League Draft history by team